The following is a list of sacred objects in Japanese mythology.

A
 Amenonuhoko
 Azusa Yumi

G
Gohei
Goshintai

H
 Hama Yumi
 Heisoku

I
Imperial Regalia of Japan

K
 Kagura suzu
 Kusanagi
 Koma-inu

M
 Mitamashiro

N
 Nihongo or Nippongo

O
 O-fuda
 O-mamori ( or )
 O-mikuji (or )
 Onbe
 O-nenju ( or )
 Ōnusa
 Otegine

S
 Shide
 Shintai
 Shimenawa
 Suzu

T
 Tide jewels 
 Three Sacred Treasures
 The Three Great Spears of Japan
 Tonbokiri
 Torii

U
 Uchide-no-Kozuchi

Y
 Yasakani no Magatama
 Yata no kagami

See also
 Glossary of Shinto
 Japanese mythology
 Shinto

External links
 Shinto Concepts

Japanese mythology
Mythological objects